Joshua "Josh" McGuire (born June 15, 1983) is a Canadian fencer who competed at the 2004 and 2008 Summer Olympics. McGuire competed in the individual foil at both Games reaching the round of 32 in 2004 and the last 16 in 2008.

McGuire took the gold medal at the 2000 Cadet Men's Foil World Championships. As a junior, he won a bronze medal at 2002 Junior World Championships.

References

External links
FIE profile

1983 births
Living people
Canadian male fencers
Olympic fencers of Canada
Fencers at the 2004 Summer Olympics
Fencers at the 2008 Summer Olympics
Sportspeople from Hamilton, Ontario
Sportspeople from Toronto
21st-century Canadian people